Ofek Antman (born 28 March 1996) is an Israeli footballer who currently plays as a goalkeeper for USL League One club Central Valley Fuego.

Career

Early career
Antman played for various teams in Israel and had a spell in the Greek second division with Panserraikos in 2018.

Central Valley Fuego
On 15 February 2022, Antman signed with USL League One expansion club Central Valley Fuego FC ahead of their inaugural season. He debuted for the club on 2 April 2022, starting and keeping a clean sheet in a 2–0 win over Greenville Triumph.

References

External links

1996 births
Living people
Association football goalkeepers
Central Valley Fuego FC players
Expatriate footballers in Greece
Expatriate soccer players in the United States
Israeli expatriate sportspeople in Greece
Israeli expatriate sportspeople in the United States
Israeli expatriate footballers
Israeli footballers
Hapoel Acre F.C. players
Hapoel Haifa F.C. players
Hapoel Ironi Kiryat Shmona F.C. players
Hapoel Ra'anana A.F.C. players
Ironi Nesher F.C. players
Liga Leumit players
Maccabi Tzur Shalom F.C. players
Panserraikos F.C. players
Super League Greece 2 players
USL League One players